Islam Said (Arabic: إسلام سعيد), referred to as Islam Chipsy, is a member of Egyptian electronic music group EEK, whose style incorporates elements of traditional Arabic wedding and electronic instruments. Their style is seen as part of a new wave of Shaabi music, referred to as Electro Shaabi or Mahraganat (Arabic: مهرجانات).

Career 
Said plays the keyboard alongside two other band members, both drummers. They are collectively styled as "Islam Chipsy" and "EEK". Said has been referred to as a "preternaturally talented keyboard player", with a unique style consisting of blasts of tone clusters deployed by alternately punching, slapping and karate-chopping his keyboard.

Personal life 
Said adopted the stage name Chipsy when another keyboardist with the same name began to take credit for his tracks.  Supposedly, since Said was frequently seen eating Chipsy (local brand of Lay's in Egypt), people started to refer to him by the name, and it stuck.

He has become more prominent in Western media along with other Electro Chaabi artists such as Sadat, Figo and Alaa Fifty Cent, all coming from 100COPIES label in Cairo, where Said signed an open contract in 2014.

Said does not want to be associated with the Mahraganat movement, as it is very much based on MCs, and his genre is generally instrumental. His success has been propelled by the development of the Shabbi selection and deviates from its main patterns. In Western countries, he has been aided by the spread and circulation of Middle Eastern music online.

Said collaborates with Dubstep producers from the United Kingdom, such as Faze Miyake, Kode 9, Pinch, Mumdance and Artwork, as part of working with the British Council.

References

Egyptian artists
Egyptian electronic musicians